The Age of Innocence is a 1993 American historical romantic drama film directed by Martin Scorsese. The screenplay, an adaptation of the 1920 novel The Age of Innocence by Edith Wharton, was written by Scorsese and Jay Cocks. The film stars Daniel Day-Lewis, Michelle Pfeiffer, Winona Ryder and Miriam Margolyes, and was released by Columbia Pictures. The film recounts the courtship and marriage of Newland Archer (Day-Lewis), a wealthy New York society attorney, to May Welland (Ryder); Archer then encounters and legally represents Countess Olenska (Pfeiffer) prior to unexpected romantic entanglements.

The Age of Innocence was released theatrically on October 1, 1993 by Columbia Pictures. It received critical acclaim, winning the Academy Award for Best Costume Design, and being nominated for Best Actress in a Supporting Role (Winona Ryder), Best Adapted Screenplay, Best Original Score and Best Art Direction. Miriam Margolyes won the Best Supporting Actress BAFTA in 1994. The film grossed $68 million against a $34 million budget. Scorsese dedicated the film to his father, Luciano Charles Scorsese, who had died the month before the film was released. Luciano and his wife, Catherine Scorsese, had small cameo appearances in the film.

Plot
In 1870s New York City, gentleman lawyer Newland Archer is planning to marry the respectable young May Welland. May's cousin, the American heiress Countess Ellen Olenska, has returned to New York after a disastrous marriage to a dissolute Polish Count. At first she is ostracized by society and vicious rumors are spread, but, as May's family boldly stands by the countess, she is gradually accepted by the very finest of New York's old families.

The countess is snubbed at one social party arranged by her family, but with the help of Archer, she is able to make a comeback at an event being hosted by the wealthy Van der Luydens. There she makes the acquaintance of one of New York's established financiers, Julius Beaufort, who has a reputation for risky affairs and dissipated habits. He begins to openly flirt with the countess both in public and in private. Archer prematurely announces his engagement to May, but as he comes to know the countess, he begins to appreciate her unconventional views on New York society and he becomes increasingly disillusioned with his new fiancée May and her innocence, lack of personal opinion, and sense of self.

After the countess announces her intention of divorcing her husband, Archer supports her desire for freedom, but he feels compelled to act on behalf of the family and persuade the countess to remain married. When Archer realizes that he has unwittingly been falling in love with the countess, he abruptly leaves the next day to be reunited with May and her parents, who are in St. Augustine, Florida, on vacation. Archer asks May to shorten their engagement, but May becomes suspicious and asks him if his hurry to get married is prompted by the fear that he is marrying the wrong person. Archer reassures May that he is in love with her. When back in New York, Archer calls on the countess and admits that he is in love with her, but a telegram arrives from May announcing that her parents have pushed forward the wedding date.

After their wedding and honeymoon, Archer and May settle down to married life in New York. Over time, Archer's memory of the countess fades.

When the countess returns to New York to care for her grandmother, she and Archer resume their friendship and then admit their love for each other. They arrange to meet secretly to consummate their relationship, but before the liaison can occur, the countess suddenly announces her intention to return to Europe.

Two weeks later, May throws a farewell party for the countess. After the guests leave, May tells Archer that she is pregnant and admits that she told the countess this news two weeks earlier despite not being sure of it at the time (the implication being that May suspected Newland’s affair of the heart and told Ellen specifically to push her into returning to Europe instead of pursuing Archer).

The years pass: Archer is 57 and has been a dutiful, loving father and faithful husband. The Archers had four children. May died of infectious pneumonia and Archer mourned her in earnest. Archer's engaged son, Ted, persuades him to travel to Paris. Ted has arranged for them to visit Countess Olenska there. Archer has not seen her in over 25 years. Ted confides to his father that May had confessed on her deathbed that "... she knew we were safe with you, and always would be. Because once, when she asked you to, you gave up the thing you wanted most."  Archer responds, "She never asked me." That evening outside the countess' apartment, Archer sends his son alone to visit her. Sitting outside in the courtyard, he recollects their time together and slowly walks off.

Cast

 Daniel Day-Lewis as Newland Archer
 Michelle Pfeiffer as Ellen Olenska
 Winona Ryder as May Welland
 Miriam Margolyes as Mrs. Mingott
 Geraldine Chaplin as Mrs. Welland
 Michael Gough as Henry van der Luyden
 Richard E. Grant as Larry Lefferts
 Mary Beth Hurt as Regina Beaufort
 Robert Sean Leonard as Ted Archer
 Norman Lloyd as Mr. Letterblair 
 Alec McCowen as Sillerton Jackson
 Siân Phillips as Mrs. Archer
 Carolyn Farina as Janey Archer
 Jonathan Pryce as Rivière
 Alexis Smith as Louisa van der Luyden
 Stuart Wilson as Julius Beaufort
 June Squibb as Mrs. Mingott's maid 
 Joanne Woodward as the narrator
 Domenica Cameron-Scorsese as Katie Blenker

Cameo appearances

Scorsese's parents, the actors Charles and Catherine Scorsese, have a small cameo appearance during the sequence in which Archer meets the countess at the Pennsylvania Terminus in Jersey City. Scorsese himself has a cameo as the "fussy bustling photographer who later takes the official wedding photographs", while Day-Lewis' sister, Tamasin Day-Lewis, has a cameo admiring May's engagement ring.

Production
The Age of Innocence was filmed on location primarily in Troy, New York. The opera scenes were filmed at the Philadelphia Academy of Music in Philadelphia, Pennsylvania. The scenes set in the home of Mrs. Mingott were filmed in "The Castle", a fraternity house belonging to the Alpha Tau chapter of Pi Kappa Phi at Rensselaer Polytechnic Institute. Formerly known as the Paine Mansion, after its completion in 1896 (then-estimated to cost $500,000), it was heralded as the grandest house in all of Troy. The scenes depicting the country house in snow were filmed inside the circa 1737 Dutch-colonial Luykas Van Alen House, in Kinderhook, New York. Only one major set was built, for an ornate ballroom sequence at the Beaufort residence. The triangular Victorian Gothic Rice Building was used as the setting for the law office.

Writing
Scorsese's friend and screenwriter Jay Cocks gave him the Wharton novel in 1980, suggesting that this should be the romantic piece Scorsese should film, as Cocks felt it best represented his sensibility. In Scorsese on Scorsese he noted that

Graphic design and titles
The film's title sequence was created by Elaine and Saul Bass. Bass, himself, noted that the titles were highly ambiguous and metaphoric, and the result of his fascination with time-lapse photography. The sequences' visual symphony of blooming roses and lace were to convey the submerged sensuality and hidden codes of the era. The famous paintings featured in the film were newly created high-quality reproductions. The bursts of color employed as a fade out were inspired by the films Black Narcissus (1947), by Michael Powell, and Rear Window (1954), by Alfred Hitchcock.

Reception

Box office
The film grossed  in the United States and Canada and $68 million worldwide from a  budget.

Critical response
On review-aggregator website Rotten Tomatoes, the film holds an approval rating of 87% based on 60 reviews, and an average rating of 7.40/10. The site's consensus states: "Equal measures romantic and wistful, Martin Scorsese's elegant adaptation of The Age of Innocence is a triumphant exercise in both stylistic and thematic restraint." On Metacritic, the film has a weighted average score of 90 out of 100, based on 35 critics, indicating "universal acclaim". Audiences polled by CinemaScore gave the film an average grade of "B+" on an A+ to F scale.

The Age of Innocence placed as the fourth best film of 1993 in a poll of 107 film critics, as it was named on over 50 lists.

Vincent Canby in The New York Times wrote: 

Roger Ebert in the Chicago Sun-Times wrote: 

He then added the film to his "Great Movies" collection, and defined the film as "one of Scorsese's greatest films".

Peter Travers in Rolling Stone wrote: 

Desson Howe in The Washington Post wrote: 

Todd McCarthy in Variety wrote: 

Rita Kempley, also in The Washington Post, wrote: 

Time Out wrote: 

But not all the critics had positive remarks. Marc Savlov in the Austin Chronicle wrote:

Accolades

At the Academy Awards, The Age of Innocence won the Academy Award for Best Costume Design (Gabriella Pescucci), and was nominated for the awards for Best Supporting Actress (Winona Ryder), Best Adapted Screenplay (Jay Cocks, Martin Scorsese), Best Original Score (Elmer Bernstein) and Best Art Direction (Dante Ferretti, Robert J. Franco).

At the Golden Globe Awards, The Age of Innocence won the Golden Globe Award for Best Supporting Actress - Motion Picture (Winona Ryder), and was nominated for the awards for Best Motion Picture – Drama, Best Director – Motion Picture (Martin Scorsese) and Best Actress – Motion Picture Drama (Michelle Pfeiffer).

At the British Academy Film Awards (BAFTAs), The Age of Innocence won the BAFTA Award for Best Actress in a Supporting Role (Miriam Margolyes). The film received another nomination in this category, for Winona Ryder, and was also nominated for the awards for Best Cinematography (Michael Ballhaus) and Best Production Design (Dante Ferretti).

In addition to her Academy Award and BAFTA Award nominations and Golden Globe Award win, Winona Ryder won the National Board of Review Award for Best Supporting Actress and the Southeastern Film Critics Association Award for Best Supporting Actress.

In addition to his Academy Award and Golden Globe Award nominations, Martin Scorsese won the National Board of Review Award for Best Director and the Elvira Notari Prize at the Venice Film Festival (shared with Michelle Pfeiffer), as well as a nomination for the Directors Guild of America Award for Outstanding Directing - Feature Film.

Elmer Bernstein was nominated for the Grammy Award for Best Instrumental Composition Written for a Motion Picture or Television.

Soundtrack

The film score for The Age of Innocence was composed by Elmer Bernstein, who had previously collaborated with Scorsese on Cape Fear (1991).
 
The film starts with a duet scene of the opera Faust from Charles Gounod.

References

Further reading 
 Cahir, Linda Costanza.  "The Perils of Politeness in a New Age: Edith Wharton, Martin Scorsese and "The Age of Innocence"" Edith Wharton Review 10#2 (1993), pp. 12–14, 19 online
 Tibbetts, John C., And James M, Welsh, eds. The Encyclopedia of Novels Into Film (2005)

External links

 
 
 
 
 
 
 
 The Age of Innocence: Savage Civility an essay by Geoffrey O’Brien at the Criterion Collection

1993 films
1990s American films
1990s English-language films
1990s historical romance films
1993 romantic drama films
American historical romance films
American romantic drama films
BAFTA winners (films)
Columbia Pictures films
Films about infidelity
Films based on American novels
Films based on works by Edith Wharton
Films directed by Martin Scorsese
Films featuring a Best Supporting Actress Golden Globe-winning performance
Films scored by Elmer Bernstein
Films set in the 1870s
Films set in the 1890s
Films set in New York City
Films set in the Victorian era
Films shot in New Jersey
Films shot in New York City
Films shot in Paris
Films shot in Philadelphia
Films shot in Rhode Island
Films that won the Best Costume Design Academy Award
Films with screenplays by Jay Cocks
Films with screenplays by Martin Scorsese
Remakes of American films
Romantic period films
Troy, New York